The Mountain Valley League is a high school athletic league that is part of the CIF Southern Section. Members public schools around Moreno Valley in Riverside County.

Members
 Banning High School-Broncos
 Moreno Valley High School
 Pacific High School
 Rubidoux High School
 San Bernardino High School 
 Vista Del Lago High School

References

CIF Southern Section leagues